The Kursenieki are also sometimes known as Curonians.

The Curonians or Kurs were a Baltic tribe living on the shores of the Baltic Sea in what are now the western parts of Latvia and Lithuania from the 5th to the 16th centuries, when they merged with other Baltic tribes. They gave their name to the region of Courland (Kurzeme), and they spoke the Curonian language. Curonian lands were conquered by the Livonian Order in 1266 and they eventually merged with other Baltic tribes contributing to the ethnogenesis of Lithuanians and Latvians.

Origin
The ethnic origin of the Curonians has been disputed in the past. Some researchers place the Curonians in the eastern Baltic group. Others hold that the Curonians were related to Old Prussians who belonged in the western Baltic group.

History

The Curonians were known as fierce warriors, excellent sailors and pirates. They were involved in several wars and alliances with Swedish, Danish and Icelandic Vikings. During that period they were the most restless and the richest of all the Balts.

In c. 750, according to Norna-Gests þáttr saga from c. 1157, Sigurd Ring, a legendary king of Denmark and Sweden, fought against the invading Curonians and Kvens (Kvænir) in the southern part of what today is Sweden:

"Sigurd Ring (Sigurðr) was not there, since he had to defend his land, Sweden (Svíþjóð), since Curonians (Kúrir) and Kvænir were raiding there."

Curonians are mentioned among other participants of the Battle of Brávellir.

Grobin (Grobiņa) was the main centre of the Curonians during the Vendel Age. Chapter 46 of Egils Saga describes one Viking expedition by the Vikings Thorolf and Egill Skallagrímsson in Courland. According to some opinions, they took part in attacking Sweden's main city Sigtuna in 1187. Curonians established temporary settlements near Riga and in overseas regions including eastern Sweden and the islands of Gotland and Bornholm.

Rimbert in his Vita Ansgari described early conflicts between the Curonians and vikings. In 854, Curonians  rebelled and refused to pay tribute to Sweden. The rebellious Apuolė fortress was first attacked by the Danes, who were hoping to make the town pay tribute to Denmark. The locals were victorious and gained much war loot. After learning of Danish failure, King Olof of Sweden organized a large expedition into Curonian lands. Olof first attacked, captured, and burned Grobiņa before besieging Apuolė. According to Rimbert, 15,000 locals defended themselves for eight days but then agreed to surrender: the Curonians paid a silver ransom for each man in the fortress, pledged their loyalty to Sweden, and gave 30 hostages to guarantee future payments.

The Curonians had a strong warrior culture and are considered to be eastern Baltic by some researchers, while others believe they were related to Old Prussians who belonged in the western Baltic group.

Some of the most important written sources about the Curonians are Rimbert's Vita Ansgarii, the Livonian Chronicle of Henry, the Livländische Reimchronik, Egils Saga, and Saxo Grammaticus's Gesta Danorum.
In c. 1075 Adam of Bremen described the Curonians in his Gesta Hammaburgensis Ecclesiae Pontificum (Deeds of Bishops of the Hamburg Church) as world-famous pagan diviners:

"... gold is very plentiful there, the horses are of the best. All the houses are full of pagan soothsayers, diviners, and necromancers, who are even arrayed in a monastic habit. Oracular responses are sought there from all parts of the world, especially by Spaniards and Greeks."

It was common for the Curonians to carry out joint raids and campaigns together with Estonians (Oeselians). During the Livonian crusade, Curonians formed an alliance with the Semigallians, resulting in a joint attack against Riga in 1228. In the same time, according to the Livonian Rhymed Chronicle, Curonians and Samogitians were known as "bad neighbours".

In the middle of the 13th century, the Curonian army included lightly armed soldiers who fought with spears, shields, fighting knives and axes, formed into an infantry platoon. Archers constituted a separate segment of an army. A heavily armed soldier could have a sword, a helmet, a shield and a wide blade axe. Heavily armed troops would make a cavalry platoon.

It is still not known what type of ships Curonians used: there are only guesses that it was similar to drakar.

Livonian Crusade

During the late Iron Age, the Curonians started to move from southern Courland to the north, assimilating a Finnic people who lived in northern Courland. They then formed a new ethnic group, the so-called Curonised Livonians.

The Curonians tightly resisted to the Livonian Crusade for a long time, contrary to the Latgallians who accepted Christianity with a light opposition.

There are many sources that mention the Curonians in the 13th century when they were involved in the Northern Crusades. In 1210 the Curonians, with eight ships, were attacked by a German crusader fleet on the Baltic Sea, near the coast of Gotland. The Curonians were victorious and German sources claim that 30 crusaders were killed.

Also in July 1210, the Curonians attacked Riga, the main crusader stronghold in Livonia. A huge Curonian fleet arrived in the mouth of the Daugava and besieged the city. However, after a day of fighting, the Curonians were unable to break through the city walls. They crossed to the other bank of the Daugava to burn their dead and mourn for three days. Later they lifted the siege and returned to Courland.

In 1228, the Curonians together with the Semigallians again attacked Riga. Although they were again unsuccessful in storming the city, they destroyed a monastery in Daugavgriva and killed all the monks there.

In 1230 the Curonians in the northern part of Courland, under their ruler (rex) , signed a peace treaty with the Germans, and the lands they inhabited thus became known as Vredecuronia or Peace Courland. The southern Curonians, however, continued to resist the invaders.

The Curonians did not lay down their arms at that time. They used the famine as a pretext for claiming economical weakness and actually did not permit the monks to enter the country. Later, the Teutonic Order tried to use Curonian cavalry in the Prussian Crusade, but Curonians were reluctant in this forced cooperation and revolted as a result in several cases.

In 1260, the Curonians were involved in the Battle of Durbe, one of the biggest battles in Livonia in the 13th century. They were forced to fight on the crusader side. When the battle started, the Curonians abandoned the knights because the knights did not agree to free any Curonians captured from the Samogitian camp. Peter von Dusburg alleged that the Curonians even attacked the Knights from the rear. The Estonians and other local people soon followed the Curonians and abandoned the Knights and that allowed the Samogitians to gain victory over the Livonian Order. It was a heavy defeat for the Order and uprisings against the crusaders soon afterwards broke out in the Curonian and Prussian lands.

Curonian resistance was finally subdued in 1266 when the whole of Courland was partitioned between the Livonian Order and the Archbishop of Riga.

Later history
Southern Curonians from Megowa, Pilsaten and Ceclis lands gradually assimilated and ceased to be known as a distinct ethnos by the 16th century. An intense period of Samogitian-Curonian bilingualism is posited because a Curonian linguistic substratum is evident in the Northern Samogitian dialect, an important part of Samogitian ethnic self-identification.

On the Latvian side during the Livonian War, the descendants of the Curonian nobility, although downgraded to peasant status, fought the Russians, as Johann Renner's chronicle reports:

The Curonian language became extinct by the 16th century.

Geography

Bishop Rimbert of Bremen (lived before 888 AD) in his life of St. Ansgar, Vita Ansgarii described the territory inhabited by the Curonians (Cori) and gave the names of the administrative districts or lands (civitates):

 Vredecuronia or Vanemane was the land in the northeast of Courland, today in the district of Talsi.
 Wynda or Ventava was the land around the mouth of the river Venta, today in the district of Ventspils.
 Bandowe (Bandava) south of Vindava, is today in the district of Kuldīga.
 Bihavelanc or Piemare, also south of Bandava, is today in the district of Liepāja.
 Powsare (Dovsare) or Duvzare was a land  further south in Courland, today in the district of Liepāja.
 Megowa or Megava (mentioned also as Negouwe in chronicles) 500 km2, was in the environs of modern Palanga, Kretinga and Šventoji.
 Ceclis or  – the largest land of 1500 km2 west of the river Venta in Samogitia, up to the Lithuanian-Latvian border.

References

External links
 Die Kuren (German)
 Rimbert: Life of Ansgar, Apostle of the North
 Nils Blomkvist. East Baltic Vikings - With Particular Consideration To The Curonians

Further reading
 Žulkus V. Kuršiai Baltijos jūros erdvėje (Curonians in the Baltic sea area). Vilnius: Versus Aureus, 2004. 254 p. .
 Nikitenka D. Pilsoto žemės pilys (Castles of the Pilsotas land). Klaipėda: Mažosios Lietuvos istorijos muziejus, 2018. 23 p. 

Medieval ethnic groups of Europe
Medieval Latvia
Medieval Lithuania
Prehistory of Prussia
Gulf of Riga
Social history of Latvia
Historical Baltic peoples